Paul G. Pinsky (born March 5, 1950) is an American educator, politician from Maryland. A member of the Democratic Party, he is currently the Director of the Maryland Energy Administration. He was previously a member of the Maryland Senate, representing District 22 in Prince George's County.

Background
Pinsky was born in Camden, New Jersey on March 5, 1950, where he attended Moorestown Friends School. He left New Jersey to attend George Washington University in Washington, D.C., where he earned a B.A. degree in public affairs in 1972. While at GWU, Pinsky attended protests in Washington, D.C. that opposed the Vietnam War and the apartheid in South Africa and supporting women's rights. He and his wife attended a national labor demonstration in the 1980s. After graduating, Pinsky worked as an educator for Prince George's County Public Schools from 1976 to 1995 and worked as an organizer for the Maryland State Teachers Association until 2014. From 1983 to 1987, he served as president of the Prince George's County Educators' Association, a labor union that represents over 6,000 professional school employees.

In 1986, Pinsky was elected to the Maryland House of Delegates, defeating incumbent David Bird in the Democratic primary election.

Pinsky has been a member of Progressive Maryland since 2001.

In the legislature
Pinsky was a member of the Maryland General Assembly from 1987 to 2023, first being elected to the Maryland House of Delegates.

In 1994, Pinsky challenged incumbent Democratic senator Thomas P. O'Reilly. During the primary election, O'Reilly resigned from the state senate to take an appointed post on the state Workers' Compensation Commission. Following his resignation, Democratic Party officials and aides of Senate President Thomas V. "Mike" Miller sought to appoint someone other than Pinsky to fill his vacancy, worrying that he would be "too liberal" and not enough of a team player. Pinsky was appointed to serve the rest of his term. He defeated Hyattsville city councilmember Charles J. Kenny Jr. in the Democratic primary, receiving 74 percent of the vote.

Pinsky has been a member of the Maryland State Senate since 1994. Along with state senator Delores G. Kelley, he is the longest serving member of the Maryland Senate.

In February 2019, Maryland Republicans condemned comments made by Pinsky during a debate on a bill that would return control of school calendars to local school boards as an effort to link governor Larry Hogan to former Alabama governor George Wallace. In an interview later, Pinsky said that he had nothing to apologize for, saying "If the senator conjures something in his head, so be it."

Following the resignation of Senate President Thomas Miller in October 2019, Pinsky tested the waters of running for Senate president.

In December 2022, governor-elect Wes Moore named Pinsky to serve as the director of the Maryland Energy Administration.

Committee assignments
Maryland Senate
 Chair, Education, Health and Environmental Affairs Committee, 2019–2023 (vice-chair, 2015–2019; member, 1994–2023; health subcommittee, 1994–2002; licensing & regulatory affairs subcommittee, 1999–2002; ethics & election law subcommittee, 2003–2006; special committee on renewables & clean energy, 2007–2010; chair, education subcommittee, 2003–2023, member, 1998–2023; co-chair, environment subcommittee, 2011–2014, 2017–2018, chair, 2007–2010, member, 2015–2023)
 Chair, Executive Nominations Committee, 2019–2023; Rules Committee, 2019–2023
 Chair, Legislative Policy Committee, 2019–2023
 Chair, Joint COVID-19 Response Legislative Work Group, 2020–2023
 Member, Joint Committee on Federal Relations, 1995–2003
 Member, Special Committee on Substance Abuse, 2001–2013
 Member, Senate Special Commission on Medical Malpractice Liability Insurance, 2004
 Member, Joint Committee on the Selection of the State Treasurer, 2007
 Senate Chair, Joint Committee on Administrative, Executive and Legislative Review, 2003–2015 (member, 1999–2003)

House of Delegates
 Member, Environmental Matters Committee, 1987–1994.

Other memberships
 Senate Chair, Prince George's County Delegation, 2001–2003
 Member, Maryland Green Caucus, 1996–2023
 Maryland Bicycle and Pedestrian Caucus, 2003–2023
 Maryland Educators Caucus, 2005–2023
 Member, National Conference of State Legislatures (agriculture, environment & energy committee, 2007–2008; agriculture & energy committee, 2008–2023; education committee, 2008–2023; environment committee, 2008–2023)
 Member, Southern Legislative Conference (energy & environment committee, 2008–2023)

Political positions
Pinsky has been described as one of the most liberal members of the Maryland legislature. He has gained a reputation as a champion of progressive causes, especially in relation to education and the environment.

Abortion
In 1988, Pinsky voted in favor of an amendment to an abortion bill that would have loosened the restrictions on Medicaid-financing of abortions. In 1991, he voted in favor of a bill that would keep abortion legal in Maryland.

COVID-19 pandemic
In May 2020, Pinsky sharply criticized Governor Hogan for his administration's acquisition of incomplete COVID-19 testing kits from South Korea. During the 2021 legislative session, Pinsky supported legislation introduced by senator Clarence K. Lam that would set new rules for emergency procurements. The bill passed and became law following a gubernatorial veto override on December 6, 2021.

Education
Pinsky introduced legislation during the 2001 legislative session that would ban advertising in schools and prevent schools from entering into exclusive agreement with snack companies. The bill was killed in the Senate, where legislators voted 26–18 to bar the proposal from coming to the Senate floor.

Pinsky introduced legislation during the 2002 legislative session that would dismantle the elected school board of Prince George's County and replace it with an all-appointed panel that would serve for four years, and replace the position of superintendent and replace it with a chief executive officer.

Pinsky introduced legislation during the 2005 legislative session that would implement new limitations on sugary snacks in schools and require that schools attach timers to in-school vending machines that would shut them down automatically.

Pinsky introduced legislation during the 2016 legislative session that would give legislators a role in selecting the state superintendent. The bill was withdrawn after its sponsors determined that it did not have enough support in the Maryland Senate to withstand a veto from Governor Hogan.

Pinsky introduced legislation in the 2018 legislative session that would provide tuition-free community college for families that make less than $150,000 a year. The bill passed and was signed into law by Governor Hogan on May 4, 2018.

During the 2019 legislative session, Pinsky led a three-year effort of getting the Maryland General Assembly to pass the Kirwan Commission's reforms of public schools. In February, Pinsky voted down a bill that would expand the number of schools that can participate in the state's P-TECH program, saying that the program needed to be studied more before it could be expanded. He also supported a bill that would overturn Governor Hogan's mandate requiring schools to start after Labor Day. In April, he supported a bill that would provide an additional $700 million in funding for Maryland public schools over two years.

Pinsky introduced legislation in the 2022 legislative session that would ensure access to high-quality course and extracurricular offerings to students of virtual schools, requires teachers of a virtual class to be employees of the county, and cap the number of students from a single school to attend the county's virtual school to 10 percent.

Elections
Pinsky previously introduced legislation that would have decreased the number of signatures an independent candidate would need to make it on a ballot.

In 2016, Pinsky proposed turning control over redistricting to a commission made up of legislative appointees provided that Republican states do the same.

Pinsky introduced legislation in the 2018 legislative session that would require presidential candidates to release their tax returns to appear on the ballot in Maryland.

Pinsky introduced legislation in the 2020 legislative session that would have created a ballot initiative that, if passed, would allowed gubernatorial candidates to select their running mate following the primary election.

Pinsky introduced legislation in the 2021 legislative session that would create a tiered system for using public funds to match qualifying gubernatorial campaign contributions through the state's Fair Campaign Finance Fund. The bill passed and became law on May 30, 2021.

During the 2021 special legislative session, Pinsky dismissed criticisms from Republicans that accused Maryland Democrats of passing congressional maps of using gerrymandering to draw a map that heavily favors the Democrats, saying that if Republicans opposed gerrymandering, they should support the federal For the People Act. In August 2021, Pinsky attended a rally outside the U.S. Capitol with hundreds of state legislators to pressure the United States Senate to pass the For the People Act.

During the 2022 legislative session, Pinsky introduced legislation that would give candidates the option of receiving public contributions from the state's Fair Campaign Financing Fund if they meet certain low-dollar fundraising thresholds and agree to spending limitations. He also supported legislation that would require vacancies in the Maryland General Assembly to be filled using special elections instead of gubernatorial appointments.

Environment
In 2008, Pinsky introduced the Global Warming Solutions Act, which requires that greenhouse gases be cut by 90 percent from all businesses in the state by 2050. An amendment introduced by senator Nathaniel Exum and backed by the administration of Governor Martin O'Malley weakened the bill's function by making this an advisory goal.

In 2011, Pinsky was arrested at a civil disobedience protest in front of the White House against the construction of an oil pipeline.

In 2016, Pinsky introduced the Greenhouse Gas Emissions Reduction Act, which requires the state to cut its greenhouse gases by 40 percent of its 2006 levels by 2030. The bill passed and was signed into law by Governor Hogan on April 13, 2016.

In 2017, Pinsky attended an activist rally outside of the Maryland State House to promote legislation that would ban hydraulic fracking in Maryland.

In 2021, Pinsky introduced the Climate Solutions Now Act, which would increase the state's goal of cutting carbon emissions from a 40 percent reduction from its 2006 levels to a 60 percent cut by 2030. He was critical of an amended version of the bill that reduced the reduction goal to 50 percent introduced by leaders of the Maryland House of Delegates, arguing that the changes "reflect a lack of urgency the leadership in the House of Delegates feels about confronting climate change". After negotiations on Pinsky's bill broke down in the final weeks of the legislative session, Pinsky tried to tack the bill's priorities onto other separate bills. Negotiations on a climate bill continued following the end of the legislative session. Pinsky reintroduced the legislation during the 2022 legislative session, promising alongside delegate Kumar Barve to move quickly on passing the bill to override a gubernatorial veto.

On its 2021 legislative scorecard, the Maryland League of Conservation Voters gave Pinsky a score of 100 percent.

Pinsky is a skeptic of nuclear energy, saying that living through scares like Chernobyl and Three Mile Island has made him unsure of its safety.

Healthcare
During his 1998 state senate campaign, Pinsky ran on providing universal healthcare coverage to all Marylanders. In 2018, he was the leading sponsor on the Senate version of the Healthy Maryland Act, which would institute Medicare-for-all, single-payer healthcare legislation in Maryland.

In 1999, Pinsky voted against a bill that would ban assisted suicide in Maryland.

Gambling
In 1987, Pinsky voted against legislation that would return slot machines to eight counties on the Eastern Shore of Maryland under the pretext that they were only used by nonprofit organizations for charitable purposes. In 2003, Pinsky opposed a bill that would legalize slot machines in Maryland and earmark almost half of the revenue for public education, arguing that the track owners' share of the profit was far too generous. In 2012, Pinsky opposed legislation that allow a new casino in Prince George's County and add Las Vegas-style table games at Maryland's five other slots venues, saying that he thinks the county should focus its economic development efforts elsewhere.

Guns
In 2013, Pinsky voted in favor of a gun control bill that would require fingerprinting of gun buyers, implement new limits on firearm purchases by the mentally ill, and mandate bans on assault weapons and on magazines that hold more than 10 bullets.

Minimum wage
Pinsky introduced legislation in the 1997 legislative session that would have raised the Maryland minimum wage from $5.15 to $7.70 over two years. The bill was killed in the Senate Finance Committee, receiving a 8-3 unfavorable vote. In 2014, Pinsky proposed continuing to increase the state's minimum wage beyond $10.10 per hour and increasing the base wage for tipped workers.

Social issues
In 1996, Pinsky and state senator Chris Van Hollen nearly derailed a plan by Senate President Thomas V. "Mike" Miller to build two new football stadiums in Baltimore and Landover by introducing legislation that would prohibit public funds from going towards the construction of the stadiums.

In 2012, Pinsky voted in favor of legalizing same-sex marriage in Maryland.

In 2013, Pinsky voted in favor of repealing the death penalty in Maryland.

Taxes
Pinsky introduced legislation in the 1996 legislative session that would have taxed corporate executives' incomes at a rate more than 20 times greater than the tax on the salaries of the companies' lowest- paid employees.

In 2012, Pinsky defended legislation that would significantly raise taxes on Marylanders earning half a million dollars or more.

In 2013, Pinsky voted in favor of legislation that raises taxes on gas to replenish the state's transportation fund.

Personal life
Pinsky was married to Joan Rothgeb, who died from pancreatic cancer on March 12, 2020. He and his wife had two daughters. He lives in University Park, Maryland.

Awards
 Legislative Award, Chesapeake Bay Foundation, 1994
 Betty Tyler Award, Planned Parenthood, 1992
 Outstanding Contribution to Youth Award, Prince George's County Council of PTAs, on behalf of Prince George's County Educators' Association
 Outstanding Contribution to the Community Award, Prince George's County Chapter, National Conference of Christians and Jews
 Citation, Maryland Healthy Air Act Coalition, 2006
 Certificate of Appreciation, Maryland Municipal League, 2008, 2009, 2010, 2011
 Climate Champion Award, Chesapeake Climate Action Network, 2009
 Legislator of the Year, Maryland League of Conservation Voters, 2012
 Consumer Hero, Maryland Consumer Rights Coalition, 2013, 2014

Electoral history

References

External links

Democratic Party Maryland state senators
Living people
1950 births
Democratic Party members of the Maryland House of Delegates
George Washington University alumni
People from University Park, Maryland
Politicians from Camden, New Jersey
21st-century American politicians